Pelișor may refer to several entities in Romania:

 The Pelișor Castle
 Pelișor, a village in Lazuri Commune, Satu Mare County
 Pelișor, a village in Bârghiș Commune, Sibiu County
 Pelișor River, a tributary of the Bârghiș River

See also 
 Peleș (disambiguation)